Saravana Stores, founded in 1969, is a chain of retail stores in India. It is the largest family owned business retail chain in India.

Locations 
Saravana Stores operates seven stores in Chennai, at T. Nagar, Purasawalkam, Porur, Padi, Sholinganallur, Chromepet and Usman Road. The company has mega stores in Madurai, Tirunelveli and Coimbatore. The company is growing rapidly and has plans to open stores in Mumbai, New Delhi, and Bengaluru The company also operates the Saravana Selvarathinam Stores, in Tirunelveli and Madurai.

Revenue 
In 2008, the company reported an annual turnover of about ₹ 650 crore (200 million US dollars).

Foray into 100% milk based ice cream 
In 2004, Saravana Stores Group launched a new ice cream brand named Jamaai, a 100% milk based ice-cream brand. The factory is located at Padappai, a suburb of Chennai en route Sriperumbudur and sold across Tamil Nadu. It has a capacity of 10,000-litres per day ice cream production and expected to expand to 30,000 litres per day.

Fire incident 
On 2 September 2008, a fire inside the building led to death of two of its employees and damages worth Crores of rupees. Unauthorized construction and ignoring safety measures are believed to be the reason.

See also
List of superstores

References 
 Saravanan Store Open in Coimbatore 2015 ..... First Owner Nithish kumar

External links 

Saravana Selvarathnam
Saravana Stores Elite
Super Saravana Stores
The Legend New Saravana Stores
Retail:What's in store? India Today article
 Ice Cream Factory
Facebook Page of SARAVANA STORES

Superstores
Retail companies of India
Retailing in Chennai
Jewellery retailers of India
Retail companies established in 1969
Companies based in Chennai
1969 establishments in Tamil Nadu